Mitchell Piqué (born 20 November 1979 in Amsterdam) is a Dutch-Surinamese former footballer who played as a left back.

Career
His former clubs are Excelsior Rotterdam, Ajax Amsterdam, FC Twente, Cambuur Leeuwarden, Excelsior, ADO Den Haag and Willem II. At Ajax he scored once; his goal coming in a 2-0 win at RKC Waalwijk on 13 October 2001.

Personal life
Mitchell's younger cousin Lorenzo played with him at ADO Den Haag.

References

1979 births
Living people
Dutch footballers
Excelsior Rotterdam players
AFC Ajax players
FC Twente players
HFC Haarlem players
TOP Oss players
SC Cambuur players
RBC Roosendaal players
ADO Den Haag players
Willem II (football club) players
Eredivisie players
Eerste Divisie players
Footballers from Amsterdam
Dutch sportspeople of Surinamese descent
Association football defenders